Chandrashekhar Dhundiraj Deshpande (14 January 1912 – 14 November 1999) was an Indian geographer, educationist and author

Life

Deshpande was born in a Marathi-speaking Deshastha Rigvedi Brahmin family of Sanskrit scholars on 14 January 1912 in Kolhapur, a city then in Kolhapur State. He studied economics, politics, and history as his basic subjects for his degree in the University of Mumbai. Subsequently, he did a diploma in geography from the University of California.

An academic innovator and teacher he worked on many fronts to improve the status of Geography as an independent science and discipline in India. For this purpose, he gathered ideas from the principal centres of geographical teaching and research in the United Kingdom. His work in the field of Geography may be divided into three spheres –  schools, universities, and geographical societies. Deshpande made vigorous efforts for the teaching of geography in schools and colleges in Maharashtra. He laid particular stress on the nature of the subject.  Deshpande's own personal efforts were also crucial in the establishment of an independent department of geography at the University of Bombay. He raised the question of founding an All-India geographical Organization, and efforts in that direction led to the establishment of the National Association of Geographers, India.

Works

Honours
 D.Litt., 1958: University of Mumbai, Mumbai, India

References

1912 births
1999 deaths
Indian geographers
20th-century Indian writers
20th-century Indian educators
20th-century geographers
Indian expatriates in the United States